In music, the Italian term stretto  (plural: stretti) has two distinct meanings:

 In a fugue, stretto is the imitation of the subject in close succession, so that the answer enters before the subject is completed.
 In non-fugal compositions, a stretto (also sometimes spelled stretta) is a passage, often at the end of an aria or movement, in faster tempo. Examples include the end of Franz Liszt's transcendental etude No.10, the end of the last movement of Beethoven's Fifth Symphony; measure 227 of Chopin's Ballade No. 3; measures 16, 17 and 18, of his Prelude No. 4 in E minor; and measure 25 of his Etude Op. 10, No. 12, "The Revolutionary."

Fugal stretto
The term stretto comes from the Italian past participle of stringere, and means "narrow", "tight", or "close". It applies in a close succession of statements of the subject in a fugue, especially in the final section. In stretto, the subject is presented in one voice and then imitated in one or more other voices, with the imitation starting before the subject has finished. The subject is therefore superimposed upon itself contrapuntally. Stretto is typically employed near the end of a fugue, where the 'piling-up' of two or more temporally off-set statements of the subject signals the arrival of the fugue's conclusion in climactic fashion.

For example, the C-major fugue from J.S. Bach’s The Well-Tempered Clavier, Book 1 (BWV 846) opens with an initial succession of statements of the subject, each at a distance of six beats:

As the musical argument proceeds, the gap between the entries closes to two beats:

In the final bars, the entries are even closer, with the upper two voices following at a distance of just one beat:

The complete C-major fugue may be heard here:

In other instances, stretto serves to display contrapuntal prowess, as in the Fugue No. 9 in E major, BWV 878, where Bach follows a traditional exposition (subject accompanied by countersubject) with a counterexposition in which the subject accompanies itself, in stretto, followed by the countersubject accompanying itself.

Fugal stretto techniques may also be found in pieces that are not themselves fugues, such as the boisterous finale of Haydn’s Quartet in E flat, Op. 76 No. 6.  In the following passage, bars 119-132, the theme is stated in the first violin with simple accompanying chord of the off beats (bars 119-122).  When repeated in bars 127-132, the viola and ‘cello lead with the theme and the violins follow closely at one beat’s distance.  This has the effect of “forever deceiving the listener as to where the main beat comes.”

See also
 Music theory

References

External links

Polyphonic form
Musical terminology
Italian words and phrases
Classical music analysis